Cheryl Hall (born 23 July 1950 in London) is a British actress. She is best known for playing  Shirley Johnson in the British sitcom Citizen Smith (1977–1979) and had a recurring role as Sadie in The Bill (1984–1988).

Biography
One of her first television appearances was in 1971 when she played Eileen, a clippie in the On the Buses episode "The Epidemic."

Hall has also appeared in Dear Mother...Love Albert playing Rodney Bewes' screen girlfriend. She appeared in the Doctor Who story Carnival of Monsters (1973). Previously, Hall had been in the final three actresses who were shortlisted for the part of the Doctor's companion Jo Grant, the other shortlisted actresses being Katy Manning and Jenny McCracken. Manning won the part, but producer Barry Letts remembered Hall and McCracken and cast them both in Carnival of Monsters, which Letts also directed. Hall also played Linda, Sid Abbott's secretary in Bless This House starring Sid James. Hall starred in an episode of Sykes (1972) and also played an inmate in one episode of Within These Walls (1974) and was David Jason's love interest in the ITV sitcom Lucky Feller (1976). She was Robert Lindsay's girlfriend in the show Citizen Smith (1977). She also had a small role in EastEnders. Film appearances included the Avarice segment of The Magnificent Seven Deadly Sins and the all-star pop comedy Three for All (1975).

Hall was the unsuccessful Labour Party parliamentary candidate for Canterbury at the 1997 general election. She also served as a member of Kent County Council, holding the position of Leader of the Labour group for a period.

Personal life
Hall was in a relationship with Robin Askwith from 1970 to 1973. She married actor Robert Lindsay in 1974 but they divorced in 1980.

Filmography

Film

Television
 On the Buses (1971) - Eileen
 The Fenn Street Gang (1971) - Brenda
 Callan (1972) - Gladys
 Albert! (1972) - Doreen Bissel
 Sykes (1972) - Deirdre
 Public Eye - Beryl Taylor
 Doctor Who (1973) - Shirna
 Z-Cars (1973) - Maureen Price
 Bless This House (1974) - Linda
 Within These Walls (1974) - Magda Selby
 The Sweeney (1975) - Jenny
 Lucky Feller (1976)  -  Kathleen Peake
 Dixon of Dock Green (1976) - Rita Batty
 Softly, Softly: Task Force (1976) - Minerva Myers
 Survivors (1977) - Mavis
 Get Some In! (1977) - Melody
 Citizen Smith (1977-1979) - Shirley Johnson
 Danger UXB (1979) - Jean
 Tales of the Unexpected - Irene Rankin
 The Gentle Touch (1981) - Bonus
 In Loving Memory (1982) - Vera Venables
 The Bill (1984-1988) - Sadie
 EastEnders (1988) - Christine
 As Time Goes By (1992) - Waitress
 Inspector Morse (1992) - Laura
 Grange Hill (1994) - Mrs. Catesby
 Casualty (1995) - Jane Turner
 Silent Witness (1999-2000) - Sheryl Marsh
 Waking the Dead (2002) - Valerie Truelove
 The Bill (2007) - Pauline Smith

References

External links

1950 births
English television actresses
Women councillors in England
Living people
Actresses from London
British actor-politicians
Labour Party (UK) parliamentary candidates
Members of Kent County Council